Robert J. McEliece (May 21, 1942 – May 8, 2019) was the Allen E. Puckett Professor and a professor of electrical engineering at the California Institute of Technology (Caltech) best known for his work in error-correcting coding and information theory. He was the 2004 recipient of the Claude E. Shannon Award and the 2009 recipient of the IEEE Alexander Graham Bell Medal. He was a life fellow of the IEEE in and was elected to the  National Academy of Engineering in 1998.

Born in Washington, D.C., and raised in Baltimore, McEliece was educated at Caltech (B.S. in 1964, Ph.D. in mathematics 1967) and attended Trinity College, Cambridge in 1964-65. 

He began working at Caltech’s Jet Propulsion Laboratory as an undergraduate, and continued there until 1978. From 1978 until 1982 he was professor of mathematics and research professor at the Coordinated Science Laboratory, University of Illinois, Urbana-Champaign. During the 1970s, he collaborated with Elwyn Berlekamp at Cyclotomics. 

In 1982 he returned to Caltech as professor of electrical engineering, retiring in 2007.  At Caltech he won five teaching awards and advised 30 Ph. D. students. From 1978 until his retirement, McEliece consulted with the Jet Propulsion Laboratory on error-correcting coding schemes.  Beginning in 1997, he consulted with SONY in Tokyo.

He had three daughters and one son. He died in Pasadena, California on May 8, 2019.

Awards and recognitions
Fellow of the Institute of Electrical and Electronics Engineers (1984)
Fellow of the IEEE Information Theory Society

Selected publications

A Public-Key Cryptosystem Based on Algebraic Coding Theory, JPL Deep Space Network Progress Report 42– 44 (1978), pp. 114–116, 
On the Inherent Intractability of Certain Coding Problems (with E. R. Berlekamp and H. Van Tilborg), IEEE Trans. Inf. Theory IT-24 (1978), pp. 384–386,

See also
McEliece cryptosystem

References

External links
McEliece website at Caltech

1942 births
2019 deaths
20th-century American mathematicians
American information theorists
Modern cryptographers
Public-key cryptographers
Fellow Members of the IEEE
People from Washington, D.C.
People from Pasadena, California